During the 1995–96 English football season, Middlesbrough F.C. competed in the FA Premier League.

Season summary
Middlesbrough returned to the top flight of English football, and recorded a solid mid-table finish under player-manager Bryan Robson. It was also Boro's first season at new home Riverside Stadium, following the decision to move out from Ayresome Park, once the Taylor report banned standing on British football stadia.

New to the Boro side for the season were record signing Nick Barmby, goalkeeper Gary Walsh (who succeeded Alan Miller as the club's regular goalkeeper) and young defender Phil Whelan. Soon after the beginning of the season, Boro paid nearly £5million for 22-year-old Brazilian forward Juninho.

Boro had peaked at fourth in the Premier League in late October after losing just one of their opening 10 games, but the next four months brought just three wins and included an eight-match losing run which posed the threat of relegation to a side who had previously been challenging for a UEFA Cup place. Boro eventually secured survival by a margin of five points.

Final league table

Results
Middlesbrough's score comes first

Legend

FA Premier League

FA Cup

League Cup

Squad

Reserve squad

References

Middlesbrough F.C. seasons
Middlesbrough